Turibio is a given name. Notable people with the name include:

 Turibio Santos (born 1943), Brazilian classical guitarist, musicologist, and composer
 Saint Turibio, born Turibius of Mogrovejo (1538–1606), Spanish missionary Archbishop of Lima

Masculine given names